Kentucky Route 2831 (KY 2831) is a  state highway in Owensboro, Daviess County, Kentucky. It runs from U.S. Routes 60 and 431 in southern Owensboro to West Fifth Street (KY 2245) and Frederica Streets in downtown.

Route description 
KY 2831 begins at an interchange with the Wendell H. Ford Expressway (U.S. Route 60, US 60) and U.S. Route 431 (US 431), It then reaches an intersection where KY 81 ends and KY 54 begins. KY 2831 ends at the intersection with KY 2245 and West Fifth Street in downtown Owensboro.

History 
From 1929 until 1953, the entire route was originally signed as KY 75. US 431 replaced the KY 75 designation in 1953, and remained on Frederica Street within the city, north of the US 60 Bypass (US 60 Byp.; Wendell H. Ford Expressway), until mid-2010, when the new KY 2831 designation replaced the US 431 alignment in the city. US 431 now ends at the junction with the former US 60 Byp.

Major intersections

References

External links
US 431 at KentuckyRoads.com

U.S. Route 431
2831
2831